The Guide International Service (G.I.S.) was an organisation set up by the Girl Guides Association in Britain in 1942 with the aim of sending teams of adult Girl Guides to do relief work into Europe after World War II. 

A total of 198 Guiders and 60 Scouts, drawn from Britain, Australia, Canada, Demark, Holland, Ireland, Kenya, New Zealand and Russia served in teams. There were many teams in place in various parts of occupied Europe - perhaps the most notable was at the Bergen-Belsen displaced persons camp - while other teams served in Greece, Holland and Malaya.

Olave Baden-Powell, World Chief Guide, grieving in Kenya after the death of her husband, Robert Baden-Powell, was persuaded to return to Britain:  
 . . . I kept receiving letters from England telling me thrilling stories of the heroism of Scouts and Guides in Britain and in the occupied countries of Europe.  Then I had one letter in particular that challenged me.  It was from Miss Tennyson, the Editor of The Guider, and she wrote, “Come home and see what Guides are doing in the war.  You will never forgive yourself if you don’t see it.”  ...

Notable volunteers
 Rosa Ward, OBE, JP, chair of the Girl Guide International Service from 1942-1954  
 Alison Duke, classical scholar, served with the GIS in Egypt and Greece
 Elizabeth Hartley (Girl Guides) vice-chair of the 20th World Conference, leader of the Training Team of the World Association Training scheme
 Lady Marjorie Stopford South Herts Division Commissioner, served with GIS in Egypt and Greece
 Stella Cunliffe MBE, first female president of the Royal Statistical Society. Cunliffe was one of the first civilians to go into Belsen Concentration Camp with the GIS
 Sue Ryder CMG, OBE, a volunteer with the Special Operations Executive in World War II and founder of Sue Ryder charity

Further reading
 All things uncertain: The Story of the G.I.S by Phyllis Stewart Brown (1966), published Girl Guides Association
 Guides can do anything by Nancy Eastick (1996), published Guides Victoria, Australia

References

International Scouting
Exile organizations
Displaced persons camps in the aftermath of World War II